Tshelang Walter Masisi (c. 1960 - August 28, 2013) was a Botswanan politician. He was an elder brother to president Mokgweetsi Masisi, and served as a member of the Pan-African Parliament and the Parliament of Botswana representing Francistown West and the Botswana Democratic Party from 1999 until his death in 2013.

Masisi was the son of Edison Masisi (1921–2003), the long-time MP for Moshupa and many-time cabinet member. One of his three brothers, Mokgweetsi, has served as the President of Botswana since 2018, while another is a retired army general. He also had a sister, Phadi.

Death
In 2000, Masisi was diagnosed with a kidney condition and was given a transplant from his wife, Ntetleng. After the surgery, he subsequently opened an organ bank to aid others. In 2012, one year before his death, Masisi and his wife suffered a near-fatal car accident on A1 Highway near Palapye while traveling to Francistown.

On August 25, 2013, Masisi was transported to the Bokamoso Private Hospital in Mmopane (also said to be located in Metsimotlhabe) before being transferred to Milpark Hospital in Johannesburg for surgery, but was sent back to Bokamoso amid complications with the procedure. Masisi died of a stroke in the early morning of the day after arriving back in Botswana. Later in the evening, family spokesperson Thulaganyo Masisi confirmed his death.

References

1960 births
2013 deaths
Botswana politicians
Members of the Pan-African Parliament from Botswana
Members of the Parliament of Botswana
Botswana Democratic Party politicians
People from Moshupa